North Sinai Governorate is one of the governorates of Egypt. It is located in the north-eastern part of the country, and encompasses the northern half of the Sinai Peninsula. It is bordered in the north by the Mediterranean Sea, in the south by South Sinai Governorate, in the west by Port Said, Ismailia, and Suez Governorates, and in the east by the Gaza Strip in Palestine (Rafah Governorate) and Israel (Southern District). Its capital is the city of El Arish. A governorate is administered by a governor, who is appointed by the President of Egypt and serves at the president's discretion.

The population of the North Sinai Governorate as at 2015 was 434,781 people, comprising predominantly Bedouin tribesmen. The Governorate covers an area of 27,574 square kilometers. The population density is 15 inhabitants per square kilometer.

A significant economic activity of the Bedouin tribes has been smuggling. They have been active smuggling into the Gaza Strip supplies and weapons using cross-border tunnels as well as assisting illegal migrants into Israel. These activities have been curtailed by the Egyptian government crackdown of smuggling into the Gaza Strip and by the building of the Egypt–Israel barrier.

North Sinai has since 2011 been especially affected by the Sinai insurgency and measures by government forces to combat it, which has resulted in many casualties. On October 14, 2016 twelve Egyptian troops were killed at a checkpoint near El Arish. On November 27, 2017 a mosque in the village of Al-Rawda was attacked by roughly 40 gunmen, killing at least 305 and injuring up to 128 others, making it the deadliest terror attack in Egyptian history.

Municipal divisions
The governorate is divided into municipal divisions for administrative purposes with a total estimated population as of July 2017 of 451,990.

Population

According to population estimates, in 2015 the majority of residents in the governorate lived in urban areas, with an urbanization rate of 60.2%. Out of an estimated total of 434,781 people, 261,686 people lived in urban areas and 173,095 lived in rural areas.

Counties and cities
North Sinai is divided into six markaz (counties), each with an eponymous city as their capitals.
 Al-Arish, also the governorate's capital and largest city, with 164,830 inhabitants . 
 Nekhel
 Rafah
 Bir al-Abd
 Al-Hassana (see Raid on Bir el Hassana and the map included therein; "bir" means "a well")
 Sheikh Zuweid

Industrial zones
According to the Egyptian Governing Authority for Investment and Free Zones (GAFI), in affiliation with the Ministry of Investment (MOI), the following industrial zones are located in the governorate:
 Bir Al Abd 
 Al Masa’eed Artisans
 Heavy industrial zone - Arish

Governors
 Muhammad Abdul Mun'em El Qirmani (May 1974-November 1976)
 Fu'ad Ibrahim Nassar (November 1976-November 1978)
 Muhammad Hussein Shawkat (November 1978-May 1980)
 Youssef Sabri Abu Taleb (May 1980-August 1982)
 Mounir Ahmad Shash (September 1982-January 1996)
 Muhammad Dasouqi El Ghayati (January 1996-July 1997)
 Ali Hifzi Muhammad (July 1997-November 1999)
 Ahmad Abdul Hamid Muhammad (November 1999-April 2008)
 Abdel Fadil Shousha (April 2008-January 2010)
 Murad Muwafi (January 2010-January 2011)
 Sayyid Abdul Wahhab Mabrouk (30 January 2011 – 8 August 2012)
 Abdul Fattah Harhour (4 September 2012 – 30 August 2018)
 Abdel Fadil Shousha (second term) (August 2018-)

References

External links

 Official website English
 
 El Wattan News of North Sinai Governorate

 
Governorates of Egypt